The Cyrillic letter Ge stroke (Ғ ғ) Italics: Ғ ғ is a Г with a horizontal stroke.  It is used in Kazakh and Uzbek where it represents a voiced uvular fricative . Despite having a similar shape, it is not related to the F of the Latin alphabet.  In Kazakh, this letter may also represent the voiced velar fricative . In the Uzbek Latin Alphabet, this letter corresponds to Gʻ.

The letter is also used in Azerbaijani, Bashkir, Tajik, Karakalpak, Shor, Siberian Tatar, and Nivkh.

Unicode renders this letter as "Ghe with stroke". it is possible that this may have been inspired by the Greek Digamma.

Usage

Computing codes

See also 
 Ge
 Kazakh language
 Uzbek language
 Azerbaijani language
 Bashkir language
 Karakalpak language
 Siberian Tatar language
 Tajik language
 Ğ ğ: Latin letter G with breve
 Ge with middle hook
 Ge with stroke and hook

References